The following is a list of soap operas from Australia, New Zealand, United Kingdom and the United States that have aired in Australia over the years, in daytime and primetime slots on both free-to-air and pay television.

the Seven Network currently airs soap Home and Away at 7:00 pm from every Mondays to Thursday, except for School Holidays, December or January, Home and Away is the last Soap opera series in Australia. Since 2019, 9Gem screens US daytime soaps Days of Our Lives (eight months behind the US) and The Young and the Restless (six months behind the US) at 1pm and 2pm weekdays respectively. Network 10 airs The Bold and the Beautiful, at 4:30 pm each weekday. Foxtel's Fox One also screens US daytime soaps Days of Our Lives and The Young and the Restless (both same day as the US). SBS Viceland broadcasts New Zealand soap, Shortland Street, weeknights at 5:30 (same day as NZ). Foxtel's BBC UKTV airs British soaps Coronation Street, EastEnders and Emmerdale, weekdays and weeknights.

Current broadcasts

Australia

Home and Away

Home and Away is an Australian soap opera that began airing on the Seven Network on 17 January 1988. During the show's early years, it aired at 5:30 pm in Adelaide, at 6:00 pm in Melbourne and Sydney, at 6:30 pm in Brisbane, and at 7:00 pm in Perth. In January 1992, Seven moved Home and Away into the 7:00 pm timeslot across the network, putting it up against rival soap opera Neighbours on Network Ten. This caused Ten to move Neighbours to the 6.30 pm timeslot two months later. Home and Away airs at 7:00 pm every Mondays to Thursday first on Seven, and is the second-longest running drama series in Australian television. 

Mid way through 2005, the Australian Communications and Media Authority (ACMA) approved a raft of changes to the Commercial Television Industry Code of Practice. One such change included allowing PG classified material to air at any time of the day. In a welcome move, Seven Network began classifying PG and M from March 2005. These relaxed changes should see the Seven Network making less edits (if any) in the future, however they continue to cut the scenes for more ad breaks.

After poor ratings in March 2013, Better Homes and Gardens began replacing Home and Away on Fridays due to Seven News 6pm news bulletin being the flagship in-house produced programme for the network as well as major expansions to AFL coverage. Friday's episodes of Home and Away now air on Thursdays at 7:30 pm.

New Zealand

Shortland Street

Shortland Street is a New Zealand soap opera that airs on Foxtel's Arena, and formerly on free-to-air digital secondary channel 7TWO. Arena began screening the show on 4 February 2013 from episode 5111; it airs at 11:30 am EST and on their timeshift channel Arena +2 at 1:30 pm EST. Arena is currently three episodes behind New Zealand.

7TWO formerly broadcast Shortland Street at 5.00 pm weekdays, and repeated the following morning at 9:30 am. Episodes were almost three years behind current New Zealand episodes. As of August 2015, 7TWO no longer broadcasts Shortland Street. The show first aired in Australia on SBS TV between 1994–1995. It then aired on BBC UKTV from 1997 until 2000. Shortland Street also aired on ABC1 between 2010–2011, weekdays at 4:30 am.

United Kingdom

Coronation Street

Coronation Street is a British soap opera that first aired in Australia in 1963 on TCN-9 Sydney, GTV-9 Melbourne and NWS-9 Adelaide. By 1966, Coronation Street was more popular in Australia than in the United Kingdom. The show eventually left some free-to-air television stations in Australia in the 1970s. It remained on some regional stations throughout the late 1970s and the 1980s and could be viewed in capital cities until 1989. It briefly returned to the Nine Network in a daytime slot during 1994–95 and picked up from where it last left off. In 2005, Channel Nine in Perth began airing Coronation Street at 5:30 pm each weekday to improve the lead in to Nine News Perth, but this did not work and the show was cancelled a few months later.

In 1996, Foxtel's Arena began screening Coronation Street in one-hour instalments on Saturdays and Sundays at 6:30. It was later moved to Foxtel's BBC UKTV where it currently airs at 7:30 pm EST each weeknight. At present episodes are approximately one
week behind the UK airings. From 2009 until September 2014, free-to-air digital secondary channel 7Two had broadcast old episodes of Coronation Street on weekdays at 10:00 am.

EastEnders

EastEnders is a British soap opera that first aired in Australia by ABC TV from 1987 until 1991. are two weeks behind the UK airings.

Emmerdale

Emmerdale is a British soap opera that began airing on BBC UKTV in July 2006 from episode 4288. It currently airs at 7:00 pm EST each weeknight. In 2006, BBC UKTV Aust. were showing episodes four months behind the UK. Emmerdale is a six episodes a week series, but only five a week were being screened. Thus over a period of years since 2006, a time lag of episodes developed. From 16 October 2017, until 11 September 2020 BBC UKTV Aust. screened two episodes nightly from Monday to Friday, as a planned catch up, episodes being aired in Australia at that time were 2 years behind the UK airings. Monday to Friday single episode screenings returned from 14 September 2020.  Currently in 2021 episodes being aired are around four weeks behind the UK Screenings.

Hollyoaks

Hollyoaks is a British soap opera that first aired in Australia on free-to-air digital secondary channel, 7Two from 18 October 2010 to January 2012, in double episodes from September 2009. The show began airing on BBC UKTV on 2 April 2013 at 6:30pm EST each weeknight. Beginning on 7 October 2013, Hollyoaks moved into a daytime slot and aired at 8:10am EST. Episodes were 16 weeks behind the UK airings. As of 12 October 2017 Hollyoaks has been removed from BBC UKTV schedules in Australia with no plans for it to return on this channel.

United States

The Bold and the Beautiful

The Bold and the Beautiful is an American soap opera airing in Australia on Network 10 weekdays at 4:30pm, with an encore replay at 7:30am.

Network 10 began airing the show on 23 November 1987 at the regular time of 1:00pm weekdays. Network 10 stopped broadcasting the show in June 1989, but reinstated it within a month after viewer protests. On 12 February 1996, the show was moved to 4:30pm. On 1 December 2008, Network 10 moved the show to a 6:00pm primetime slot. The shift in timeslot led to some protests from regular viewers. The show did not rate as well at 6:00pm and was moved back to the 4:30pm timeslot on 19 January 2009.

From 1996 to 30 November 2015, the show was regularly edited by Network 10 to meet the Australian G classification for the 4:30pm timeslot. Edits included cutting some violent or sexually explicit scenes, as well as use of words such as 'rape', 'abortion', 'slut', 'whore', and 'sex'. In August 1999, Australian media regulator the Australian Communications and Media Authority upheld a complaint against Network 10 that it had broadcast material that did not meet the requirements of the G classification in one episode of the show; Network 10 said it would exercise more care with future broadcasts.

On 23 February 2012, Network 10 began removing up to 90 seconds from each episode to ensure they ran no longer than 20½ minutes in length. In the bizarre move, Network 10 would cut exterior location footage; shorten long lingering stares; remove the opening & closing credits. Network 10 made these non-classification edits after any classification edits necessitated in order to keep episodes G-rated. David Knox of TV Tonight, Australia's leading TV blog, sought comment from Network 10 and exposed the unnecessary editing in an article on his blog. On 19 September 2014, upon publication of the article, Network 10 immediately ceased all non-classification edits however they continue to remove the closing credits.

On 3 December 2012, Network 10 added a repeat of the previous day's episode, airing weekday mornings at 9:00am. 10 used the late afternoon G-rated edit for the morning repeat, despite being permitted to screen PG content during early mornings. The repeat broadcast was discontinued on 1 November 2013 to make way for new morning programming, however was reinstated on 26 May 2014 at 7:30am. In regional affiliated areas, the repeat broadcast was discontinued on 1 July 2016 to make way for WIN Television's All Australian News from 7:00am. In fact, WIN switched affiliations from the Nine Network to Network 10 under the new affiliation deal.

In April 2013, the show had an average rating of 415,000 viewers in the 4:30pm timeslot.

On 26 March 2015, Network 10 aired the 7000th episode at a special time of 3.30pm with a PG classification.

On 1 December 2015, the Australian Communications and Media Authority (ACMA) approved a raft of changes to the Commercial Television Industry Code of Practice. One such change included allowing PG classified material to air at any time of the day. In a welcome move, Network 10 began classifying The Bold and the Beautiful PG from 1 December 2015. These relaxed changes should see Network 10 making less edits (if any) in the future, however they continue to excise the closing credits.

Between 2 May 2018 and 8 June 2018, Network 10 aired double episodes from 4:00pm to bring Australian viewers 2 weeks behind the US.

On 3 July 2018, Network 10's online catchup service, 10 Play, began offering episodes in sync with the US. Episodes drop at 7:00am AEST Tuesday through Saturday.

On 29 April 2020 until 7 July 2020, Network 10, re-aired 50 classic episodes of The Bold and the Beautiful as due to Coronavirus, also available on 10 Play all 50 classic episodes.

The Network 10 is currently 1 week behind the CBS broadcast in the US.

Days of Our Lives

Days of Our Lives is an American soap opera airing in Australia on Fox One weekdays at 12:00pm and from 2 September 2019, weekdays at 12pm on 9Gem.

It was originally broadcast on the Nine Network's main channel from 25 March 1968 to 26 April 2013 at 2:00 pm each weekday. During its run on the Nine Network in the early 2000s, episodes ended up being nearly five years behind the United States, due to the network's coverage of cricket each summer. In an attempt to get viewers up to date with the US, Nine aired a one-hour special on 13 September 2004 titled, Days of Our Lives: A New Day, which summarized four years of storylines and caused mixed feelings among regular viewers. This special was followed by episodes airing at the same pace as the US. However, the show ended up being behind the US again, and by April 2013, episodes were airing at a delay of 16 months.

On 15 April 2013, Nine announced that they decided to not renew its contract with the show.

On 17 June 2013, Days of Our Lives resumed to Australian viewers free and on-demand at Crackle.com, as well as across Crackle's web apps on mobile devices, connected TVs and game consoles. Crackle picked up where the Nine Network left off with 10 new episodes in its first week and seven new episodes every Monday thereafter. From 20 January 2014, Crackle began releasing five episodes each week until 8 April 2016.

Days of Our Lives returned to television on Foxtel's channel Arena on 1 April 2014. It airs weekdays before The Young and the Restless at 12:00 pm EST, and on the timeshift channel Arena +2 at 2:00 pm EST. In order to bring TV viewers up to date, Arena screened ten catch up episodes, each presented by Days of Our Lives cast members, from 1 April 2014 to 14 April 2014, featuring key storylines missed during the 11-month Australian television hiatus. Then on 15 April 2014, Arena began airing episodes at the same pace as the US. An encore of the weeks full episodes screen on Arena each Sunday morning from 7:00 am EST.

In December 2017, Regional Network Ten Affiliate WIN Television bought the rights to the program as well as fellow soap The Young and the Restless. This was seen as a return to free to air for the two US soaps, as they have not been broadcast on free to air since 26 April 2013 (Days) and 23 February 2007 (Y&R) when Nine did not renew the rights. Although the soaps returned, the episodes are still a few years behind. However, viewers can access new episodes of the soaps on Foxtel. WIN Television concluded its run of Days and Y&R in late November 2018.

On 21 August 2019, it was announced that after 6 years off free to air respectively, the series would be returning to the Nine Network. The soap originally was scheduled to return on 31 August 2019 in East Coast and Darwin, while on 1 September 2019 in Adelaide and Perth viewers only and air on Nine's digital multichannel 9Gem and Nine's SVOD service 9Now. Since the episodes are M rated, the catch up episodes did not go ahead as planned and instead they screened from 2 September 2019 - 6 September 2019. The daily episodes commenced 9 September 2019.

Nine is currently 2021–22 season.

The Young and the Restless

The Young and the Restless is an American soap opera airing in Australia on Fox One weekdays at 12:50pm and from 2 September 2019, weekdays at 1pm on 9Gem.

It was originally on the Nine Network's main channel from 4 March 1974 to 23 February 2007. Nine paired The Young and the Restless with Days of Our Lives, with the two shows airing one after the other. During its run on the Nine Network in the early 2000s, episodes ended up being nearly five years behind the United States (varying slightly between states), due to the network's coverage of cricket each summer. As was the case with Days of Our Lives, Nine aired a one-hour special on 14 September 2004 titled, The Young and the Restless: The Next Chapter, which summarized four years of storylines and caused mixed feelings among regular viewers . This special was followed by episodes airing at the same pace as the US.

On 23 January 2007, it was announced that Nine had not renewed its contract with The Young and the Restless, and that Foxtel would pick up the show from where Nine left off.

On 2 April 2007, the show began airing on W at 12:00 pm EST and 6:40 pm EST, and on its timeshift channel W2 at 2:00 pm EST and 8:40 pm EST. The Young and the Restless moved to Arena on 20 August 2012 after W rebranded as SoHo. It now airs on Arena at 12:45 pm EST, and on its timeshift channel Arena +2 at 2:45 pm EST. Australia is currently hiatus behind the US broadcast at present.

On 21 August 2019, it was announced that after 12 years off free to air respectively, the series would be returning to the Nine Network. The soap was originally scheduled to return on 31 August 2019 in East Coast and Darwin, while on 1 September 2019 in Adelaide and Perth viewers only and air on Nine's digital multichannel 9Gem and Nine's SVOD service 9Now. Since the episodes are M rated, the catch up episodes did not go ahead as planned and instead screen from 2 September 2019 - 6 September 2019. The daily episodes commenced 9 September 2019.

Nine is currently 2021–22 season.

Former broadcasts

Australia

Neighbours

Neighbours is an Australian soap opera that first aired on the Seven Network on 18 March 1985. The first season aired at 5:30 pm in Sydney, at 6:00 pm in Melbourne and Adelaide, and at 7.00 pm in Brisbane. Neighbours underperformed in Sydney, where it was then moved to a 3.30 pm timeslot. By September 1985, the show was cancelled by Seven after 170 episodes. Neighbours was then picked up by rival network Ten, where it began screening with episode 171 on 20 January 1986 at 7:00 pm.
In May 1989, Better Homes and Gardens on Ten, began replacing Neighbours every Fridays due to Ten’s NRL coverage. Friday's episodes of Neighbours airs on Thursdays at 7:30 pm, this carried on until Mid/late 1994. In March 1992, the show moved to the 6:30 pm Monday to Thursday timeslot to avoid direct competition from rival soap opera Home and Away on the Seven Network. In 2011, Ten moved Neighbours to its digital secondary channel 10 Peach (formerly Eleven), due to poor ratings. The show began screening on 10 Peach on 11 January 2011, the channel's launch day. Neighbours aired at 6:30 pm each weeknight, the series aired the 90 minutes Series Finale on Thursday 28 July 2022 at 7:30pm on Network 10 and 10 Peach, and was the longest running drama series in Australian television.

United Kingdom

Doctors

Doctors is a British soap opera that began airing in Australia from 2 April 2013 on BBC UKTV each weekday. Episodes were around two weeks behind the UK airings. BBC UKTV ceased screening episodes of Doctors from 29 August 2014.

United States

All My Children

All My Children is an American soap opera that aired briefly on Network Ten in the late '80s, on Fox Soap in the late '90s, and on 7TWO from 2009 to 2011.

Another World

Another World is an American soap opera that appeared variously on both Nine Network and Network Ten. It particular became very popular in the early 1990s when Australian actress Carmen Duncan played the role of villainous Iris Wheeler. Foxtel relaunched the series in 1995 being only 3 months behind the U.S. and continued to air it til its final episode in September 1999.

As the World Turns

As the World Turns is an American soap opera that aired for a short period on Network Ten, first at 1.30 pm, then moved to 5:00 pm before ultimately being dropped entirely in 1987.

General Hospital

General Hospital is an American soap opera that first aired on the Seven Network in Australia from 1968. Later it was aired by the Nine Network from 1983, with episodes five years behind the US. By the late '80s, the show was in a slump, and left Australian television soon after but did remain on regional stations. It was revived in 1990 by Network Ten placed in many different time slots such as 11:00am, 12:00pm, 3:30pm and 5:00am. It remained in this timeslot when until 6 June 1997 where it was taken off the air. It was revived again in 1999, lasting less than a year. General Hospital was picked up by Foxtel in 2004. After running for several months on W, the show was moved to FOX8, before being pulled altogether in December 2005. Fans in Australia lobbied hard to get it back. General Hospital returned to Australian television on 5 July 2010, again on W, at 12:50 pm and on its time shift channel W2 at 2:50 pm, with episodes ten weeks behind after the US. W dropped the show on 17 June 2011.  General Hospital has had Australian-born actors George Lazenby, Rick Springfield, Tristan Rogers, and Thaao Penghlis as cast members.

Generations

Generations is an American soap opera that had a short run on Australian television. It was screened on the Seven Network in the early hours of the morning.

Loving

Loving is an American soap opera that aired for a short time on the Nine Network in an early morning time slot in the late 1980s. Foxtel relaunched the show as part of its soap line up in 1996 keeping it on air until it reached the end and began screening The City.

One Life to Live

One Life to Live is an American soap opera that appeared briefly on Network Ten's daytime schedule in the late 1980s. The series was aired at 1:30 just after "The Bold And The Beautiful". It was also part of Foxtel's channel Fox Soap in the 1990s.

Passions

Passions is an American soap opera that aired on the Seven Network from 2001 to 2008 and Seven affiliate Prime from 2001 to 2004. It originally began in a 3:00 pm time slot on weekday afternoons, before being shifted to a 9:30 am time slot in 2005. New episodes stopped airing in Australia later that year, as NBC Productions judged it too expensive to clear music rights for international distribution. Passions then moved into re-runs at a 2:00 am time slot.

Rituals

Rituals is an American soap opera that had a short run on Australian television and featured Australian-born actor George Lazenby. It was screened on the Seven Network in the early hours of the morning.

Santa Barbara

Santa Barbara is an American soap opera that aired on Network Ten from 1987 to 1994. It premiered on Australia television the same day as The Bold and the Beautiful in November, in a soap opera block from 12:00 pm to 1:30 pm.  The show had Australian-born actors Thaao Penghlis and Dame Judith Anderson as cast members.

Sunset Beach

Sunset Beach is an American soap opera that aired in an early morning time slot from 1999 to 2001 on Network Ten, then Foxtel's FOX SOAP/TALK channel, and finally FOX8. After reaching the final episode, FOX8 re-screened the final 6 months in double episodes early weekday mornings.

Texas

Texas, the spin-off of Another World, is an American soap opera that aired on Network Ten in an early morning time slot in the early 1980s.

References